Vittore Stocchi (1895–1987) was an Italian rower. He competed at the 1928 Summer Olympics in Amsterdam with the men's eight where they were eliminated in the quarter-final.

References

1895 births
1987 deaths
Italian male rowers
Olympic rowers of Italy
Rowers at the 1928 Summer Olympics
European Rowing Championships medalists